The 1947 Humboldt State Lumberjacks football team represented Humboldt State College during the 1947 college football season. Humboldt State competed in the Far Western Conference (FWC).

The 1947 Lumberjacks were led by head coach Joseph Forbes in his second and last year as coach at Humboldt State. They played home games at the Redwood Bowl in Arcata, California. Humboldt State finished with a record of five wins and four losses (5–4, 2–2 FWC). The Lumberjacks outscored their opponents 159–131 for the season.

In two seasons under coach Forbes, the Lumberjacks compiled a record of 10–7–1. They had winning seasons in both years and won the conference championship in 1946.

Schedule

Notes

References

Humboldt State
Humboldt State Lumberjacks football seasons
Humboldt State Lumberjacks football